Weasand may refer to:

 Weasand, a term for the oesophagus, obsolete as regards human anatomy, but current in the meatpacking industry
 Weasand clip, a device in meatpacking for closing off the weasand
 Weasand (comics), a minor adversary of Batman
 A geographical term denoting a narrow place
 Weasand of Cados, a fictional location in Tales of Vesperia